A poll aggregator is an entity that tracks and aggregates, often but not exclusively by averaging, individual polls conducted by different organizations in order to gauge public sentiment on key civic issues such as the approval rating of a major political figure (e.g., president, prime minister, monarch, governor, lawmaker, etc.), or legislative body; or to measure likely public support for an individual candidate or political party in an upcoming election.

Individual poll aggregation 
A poll aggregator may also forecast the likely outcome of upcoming elections by gathering and analysing pre-election polls published by others, and/or utilizing other available politics-related information which, according to its methodology, may affect the outcome of an election. For example, an aggregator may attempt to predict the winner of a presidential election or the composition of a legislature, or it may focus on attempting to determine current opinion by smoothing out poll-to-poll variation. Editorial commentary by the site's owners and others complements the data.  Interest and web traffic peak during the last few weeks before the election.

How individual polls are aggregated varies from site to site. Some aggregators take a long- or short-term running/rolling average or average the polls at certain points in time, while other aggregators might take a weighted poll average (e.g., giving less weight to older polls), or use some other proprietary method of aggregation, based on such factors as past pollster accuracy, age of the poll, or other more subjective factors.  The averaging method has been criticized by at least one statistician because it doesn't weight them by sample size. In this way the resulting average support percentages do not reflect the actual support percentage for any candidate of the pooled polls. According to the American Association for Public Opinion Research, "[o]ther aggregators use regression-based analyses — a method for adjusting data to account for unusual results ('outliers'). Other aggregators combine additional data like historical election results or economic data with current polling data through statistical methods – these are often called modelers."

Aggregators are not capable of accounting for systematic errors in the polls themselves. For instance, if pollsters are misjudging the turnout demographics, aggregators cannot undo these errors. Likewise, when there is a tendency to herd (i.e. for different pollsters to converge on a particular result to avoid being an outlier), aggregators will reflect this.

Aggregators are useful in U.S. presidential elections because the presidency is determined by the winner of state by state elections (see Electoral College), and not by simple popular vote of the entire nation. Consequently to predict a winner, polls of individual states becomes more significant. An equivalent issue may arise in parliamentary systems if the legislature is sufficiently malapportioned as in Canada.

Veteran political journalist Bill Moyers has commented that poll aggregators are a good tool for sorting out the polls.

Real Clear Politics was the first such website.  It began aggregating polls in 2002 for the congressional elections that year.  Several sites existed by 2004, including Andrew S. Tanenbaum's Electoral-vote.com, and Sam Wang's Princeton Election Consortium.  Relative newcomer FiveThirtyEight began in 2008 by baseball statistician Nate Silver and has been lauded for the quality of its analysis.  Pollster.com by Mark Blumenthal, now affiliated with the Huffington Post as Huffpost Pollster, has likewise been given a top ranking for the depth and breadth of its chartable polling data. Since 2010 the political blog Talking Points Memo has also sponsored a "PollTracker" feature which aggregates opinion polls. Other noteworthy examples include Drew Linzer's Votamatic,  Josh Putnam's Frontloading HQ as well as Politics by the Numbers by Jay DeSart and Tom Holbrook. For an aggregator of poll aggregators see the PollyVote, which combines different polling averages as one component of a combined forecast of the US presidential election result. 

In Australia, William Bowe's Poll Bludger hosts the Bludger Tracker poll aggregator.

Europe Elects is a poll aggregator that collects voting intention polling data from across the European continent. The organization was founded in 2014.

Aggregating poll aggregators 

Given the proliferation of poll aggregators such as those mentioned above, a notable approach to poll aggregation is not to aggregate individual polls as has been done for years, but rather to aggregate the poll aggregators so as to (arguably) provide an even more stable overview of polling data. PollyVote, noted above, is a prominent example of an aggregator of poll aggregators.

References

Aggregation websites
Polling